In Norse mythology, Gullinkambi (Old Norse "golden comb") is a rooster who lives in Valhalla. In the Poetic Edda poem Völuspá, Gullinkambi is one of the three roosters whose crowing is foretold to signify the beginning of the events of Ragnarök. The other two roosters are Fjalar in the wood Gálgviðr, and an unnamed soot-red rooster in Hel:

It has been suggested that the central tree depicted in the Överhogdal tapestries is the world tree Yggdrasil and that the bird at the top is Gullinkambi.

In popular culture
Gullinkambi is referenced in the song "Gullinkambi's Return" by The Venetia Fair. Gullinkambi is the ringleader.

Notes

References

 Bellows, Henry Adams (Trans.) (1936). The Poetic Edda. Princeton University Press. New York: The American-Scandinavian Foundation.
 Schön, Ebbe (2004). Asa-Tors Hammare, Gudar och Jättar i tro och Tradition. Fält & Hässler, Värnamo. 
 Simek, Rudolf (2007) translated by Angela Hall. Dictionary of Northern Mythology. D.S. Brewer. 
 Thorpe, Benjamin (Trans.) (1866). Edda Sæmundar Hinns Frôða: The Edda of Sæmund the Learned. Part I. London: Trübner & Co.

Birds in Norse mythology
Mythological galliforms